STM may refer to:

Technology
 Scanning tunneling microscope, a non-optical microscope
 Signature-tagged mutagenesis, a genetic technique to create random mutants
 STMicroelectronics, a Dutch manufacturer of electronics and semiconductors
 STM (Turkish company), a military technology company in Turkey
 STM-1, Synchronous Transport Module, the basic rate of transmission of the SDH ITU-T fiber optic network
 STM32, a family of 32-bit microcontroller integrated circuits by STMicroelectronics
 Software transactional memory, a method of handling concurrency in multithreaded systems
 Stepper motor, a type of electric motor
 Canon autofocus lenses that use stepper motor technology which makes them especially quiet
 .stm, a filename extension used by:
 Web administration panel, of Belkin routers 
 Streaming Media File, in Microsoft Exchange Server
 Scream Tracker, music tracker software

Transportation
 Société de transport de Montréal, the public transport provider in Montreal, Quebec, Canada
 Amtrak ticketing code for Stamford Transportation Center, a railway station in Stamford, Connecticut, US
 Sea traffic management, a set of systems and procedures to guide and monitor sea traffic in a manner similar to air traffic management
 Space traffic management
 Strategic Traffic Manager, a Bus Priority application designed to work as part of an intelligent transportation system
 Santarém-Maestro Wilson Fonseca Airport, Santarém, Pará|Santarém, Brazil, by IATA airport code
 St. Thomas Mount railway station, Chennai, Tamil Nadu, India, by station code

Publishing
 International Association of Scientific, Technical, and Medical Publishers, an association of publishers
 Science, technology, and medical publishing, a market segment of academic publishing
 Science Translational Medicine, an American medical journal

Other uses
 Sacrae Theologiae Magister, or Master of Sacred Theology, an academic degree
 St Thomas College of Engineering and Technology, Kannur , Kerala , India
 St. Thomas More College, a Catholic, undergraduate, liberal arts college located in Saskatoon, Saskatchewan, Canada
 St. Thomas More Collegiate, a Catholic secondary school in Burnaby, British Columbia, Canada
 Short-term memory, the capacity for holding a small amount of information for a short period of time
 Small Tactical Munition, a weapon developed by Raytheon
 Stabilisation Tracking Mechanism, the mirror instrument of the Stabilisation and Association Process (SAP) for Kosovo
 ST"M, a Hebrew acronym meaning a scribe

See also
 STM200, a pseudonym for Takeshi Matsumoto, musician featured in the music video game Dance Dance Revolution 5thMix
 STEM fields, an education and publishing classification
 ST1M a.k.a. Billy Milligan, real name Nikita Legostev, a Russian rapper